In ancient Celtic religion, Ialonus Contrebis or Ialonus or Gontrebis was a god (or perhaps two related gods) worshipped in what are now Lancashire and Provence. Ialonus is thought to be the god of clearings and/or meadows.

Name 
The name Ialonus, which may have designated a god of clearing, derives from the Celtic stem ialo(n)- ('cleared place, clearing'; cf. Middle Welsh ial 'clearing', an-ial 'wasteland'). The stem ialon- also had the meaning 'village' in Gaulish. In the words of Xavier Delamarre, "In forest-covered Gaul, a village was essentially established by clearing a wood."

The name Contrebis is based on the prefix con- ('with, together') attached to the root -treb- ('settlement'; cf. Old Irish treb, Middle Welsh tref, Old Breton treff 'town, dwelling-place'). It can be compared with the Celtiberian place name Contrebia, meaning 'conurbation'.

Cult 
He is known from three dedicatory inscriptions. One, at Lancaster, was dedicated (in the dative) to Deo Ialono Contre Sanctissimo ("to the holiest god Ialonus Contre[bis]"); another, at Overborough or Over Burrow near Kirkby Lonsdale, to Deo San Gontrebi ("to the holy god Gontrebis"). In the third inscription, found at Nîmes in Provence, Ialonus was invoked in conjunction with the goddess Fortune.

References

Bibliography

 Miranda Green (1997). Dictionary of Celtic Myth and Legend. Thames and Hudson Ltd, London.

Gods of the ancient Britons
Tutelary deities